Varkash is a village in Miyan Taleqan Rural District, in the Central District of Taleqan County, Alborz Province, Iran. At the 2006 census, its population was 258, in 82 families.

References 

Populated places in Taleqan County